The governor of North Dakota is the head of government of the U.S. state of North Dakota. The current officeholder is Republican Doug Burgum. The Governor of North Dakota has the power to sign or veto laws and to call the Legislative Assembly into emergency session. The officeholder, who is also chairman of the North Dakota Industrial Commission, has an ex officio residence. Until 2022, there were no limits on the number of terms a governor may serve.

Governors of Dakota Territory

Governors of North Dakota

Succession

See also

Notes

External links
State Historical Society of North Dakota, North Dakota Governors

North Dakota

Governors
Governors